The 2015 Coastal Carolina Chanticleers football team represented Coastal Carolina University in the 2015 NCAA Division I FCS football season. They were led by fourth-year head coach Joe Moglia and played their home games at Brooks Stadium. They were in their final season as a member of the Big South Conference. They finished the season 9–3, 4–2 in Big South play to finish in second place. They received an at-large bid to the FCS Playoffs where they lost in the first round to The Citadel.

The Chanticleers joined the Sun Belt Conference in July 2016, initially as a full but non-football member.  The football team will begin a transition to the NCAA Division I Football Bowl Subdivision (FBS), joining Sun Belt football in 2017 and gaining full FBS membership and bowl eligibility in 2018.

Schedule

Source: Schedule

Game summaries

at Furman

at South Carolina State

Western Illinois

Bryant

Alabama A&M

Presbyterian

at Monmouth

at Charleston Southern

Gardner–Webb

Kennesaw State

at Liberty

FCS Playoffs

First Round–The Citadel

Ranking movements

References

Coastal Carolina
Coastal Carolina Chanticleers football seasons
Coastal Carolina
Coastal Carolina Chanticleers football